The 1945 Detroit Titans football team represented the University of Detroit as an independent during the 1945 college football season. In their first season under head coach Chuck Baer, the Titans compiled a 6–3 record and outscored their opponents by a combined total of 193 to 114.

The team's coaching staff consisted of Chuck Baer (head coach and line coach), Edmund Barbour (backfield coach), Lloyd Brazil (end coach, assistant backfield coach, and athletic director), and Dr. Raymond Forsyth (trainer). The team had game captains rather than selecting one or two players as the team captain or captains for the full season.

Schedule

See also
 1945 in Michigan

References

External links
 1945 University of Detroit football programs

Detroit
Detroit Titans football seasons
Detroit Titans football
Detroit Titans football